The 1926 United States Senate election in Colorado took place on November 2, 1924. Incumbent Republican Senator Rice W. Means ran for re-election, but he was defeated in the Republican primary by Charles W. Waterman, a prominent attorney and party leader. In the general election, Waterman faced former Governor William Ellery Sweet, the Democratic nominee. Despite the nationwide Democratic trend, as well as the landslide victory for Democrats in the gubernatorial election, Waterman ended up defeating Sweet by a thin margin. Waterman would not end up serving a full term in the Senate, and died in office on August 27, 1932.

Democratic primary

Candidates
 William Ellery Sweet, former Governor of Colorado
 Paul P. Prosser, Denver attorney, former Howard County, Missouri, Prosecuting Attorney
 Frank J. Hayes, former President of the United Mine Workers

Dropped out
 Harry L. Lubers, former Speaker of the Colorado House of Representatives

Defeated at convention
 H. C. Fink, Montrose attorney

Campaign
At the Democratic convention, a crowded slate of candidates was slightly winnowed down. Paul P. Prosser, a prominent Denver attorney who had previously been elected as the Howard County, Missouri, Prosecuting Attorney, placed first with 569 1/2 votes. He was followed by former Governor William Ellery Sweet with 279 1/2, former State House Speaker Harry L. Lubers with 133, and former labor leader Frank J. Hayes with 121. Attorney H. C. Fink received only 18 votes and was eliminated. Shortly after the convention, Lubers dropped out, concluding that he lacked the financial resources to compete in the primary. Sweet ended up defeating Prosser and Hayes by a decisive margin, though he fell just short of winning a majority.

Results

Republican primary

Candidates
 Charles W. Waterman, attorney, 1924 Republican candidate for the U.S. Senate
 Rice W. Means, incumbent U.S. Senator
 George A. Luxford, Denver County Court Judge
 Mortimer W. Spaulding, Denver attorney

Results

General election

Results

References

Colorado 1926
Colorado 1926
1926
Colorado
United States Senate